Inheritance and gift taxes in Canada have a complex history dating back to Canadian Confederation. They are beginning to see a return to prominence in the provincial sphere.

Provincial succession duties
Succession duties have been held to be valid "direct taxation within the province," and can apply in the following scenarios:

property of a deceased person, whether he was at the time of his death domiciled in the Province or domiciled elsewhere, situate within the Province passing to any person for any beneficial interest
property of a deceased situate outside the Province at the time of the death of the deceased, and the beneficiary of any of the property of the deceased was a resident at the time of the death of the deceased
where the deceased person was at the time of his death domiciled in the Province, and where the property of the deceased comprises any personal property situate without the Province in respect of which any beneficial interest passes under the law of the Province to a person who is domiciled or resident in the Province

Succession duties came into effect in the various provinces at the following times:

Many incidents involving double taxation arose from liability to duty in different provinces, as well as other jurisdictions abroad, which were dealt with inconsistently among the provinces.

Collection in Ontario

Ontario was especially notable in its pursuit of duties. Mitchell Hepburn, in his capacity as Treasurer of Ontario, adopted a more aggressive approach in their collection on large estates, which resulted in millions of dollars in extra government revenues. He made no apologies for doing so, as he noted in a speech in 1938.

In 1937, legislation was passed that allowed for reexamination of estates for deaths that had occurred back to the beginning of 1916, and also included many gifts inter vivos within the duty's scope. Hepburn consequently ordered that all files relating to estates worth $500,000 or more, together with those of smaller estates where evasion was suspected, were to be reopened, with the expectation of raising further duties anywhere from $70 million to $100 million. The collection tactics employed included the seizure of books and records without a warrant, different methods for valuing assets, and the assessment of penalties that could amount to double or triple the amount of the duty involved.

One estate of particular focus in this campaign was that of the late John Rudolphus Booth, who had died in 1925. Although succession duties of $4.28 million were paid in 1927, Hepburn subsequently claimed more in 1937. Booth's heirs eventually paid another $3 million in 1939.

Where succession duty could apply
Duty cannot be charged where property is left outside the province to beneficiaries who are neither resident nor domiciled in the province. Taken as a whole, chargeability to succession duty depended upon whether the donor's domicile, the donee's residence, as well as the donee's status at the date of the deceased's death and the date of the disposition of the estate. In 1967, Ontario published a table outlining the various effects:

Federal estate taxes

Death taxes, which were not subject to the territorial limitations that affected provincial taxation, were first introduced at the federal level under the Dominion Succession Duty Act passed in 1941.() in 1941, In his Budget speech that year, Minister of Finance James Lorimer Ilsley explained why the federal government was entering in this area of revenue:

It was later replaced by the Estate Tax Act in 1958, which was repealed at the end of 1971.

The succession duty focused on the succession being transferred, as opposed to the estate itself, which made it similar in scope to the UK's Succession Duty Act 1853. The estate tax, in comparison, was modelled more along the line of the US estate tax.

At the introduction of each tax, the property that was subject to each was identified as follows:

Gift tax
Gift tax was introduced as part of R.B. Bennett's New Deal in 1935. It was framed as an antiavoidance measure, as explained by Edgar Nelson Rhodes in that year's Budget speech:

As a consequence, it was imposed by the Parliament of Canada later that year as part of the Income War Tax Act.

The tax was wide in its scope:

 it applied to any property (whether situated inside or outside Canada) transferred by way of gift or donation
 it applied "whether the transfer is in trust or otherwise, or direct or indirect, or whether the property is real or personal, tangible or intangible, and shall extend to gifts made by personal corporations"
 several classes of gifts or donations were exempt from tax: those in any year that totalled $4000 or less; those taking effect upon death; those made to charitable or educational institutions, Canada or any province, and certain ones not recognized for income tax purposes
 where a gift is made to a minor aged 13 to 18 years, liability for tax will not arise until the 19th birthday, provided that the donor has supplied a bond securing the payment of the tax
 the donor is liable to pay the tax, otherwise there is joint and several liability by both the donor and donee

Post-war involvement in revenues

Federal-provincial revenue-sharing arrangements (1947-1971)
From 1947 to 1971, there was a complicated set of federal-provincial revenue-sharing arrangements, where:

 In Newfoundland, Prince Edward Island, Nova Scotia, New Brunswick and Manitoba, the federal government collected estate taxes at full rates, but remitted 75% of the revenues derived from each of those provinces;
 In Alberta and Saskatchewan, the federal government collected estate taxes at full rates, but remitted 75% of the revenues derived from each of those provinces, which was rebated back to the estate;
 In British Columbia, the federal government collected estate taxes at only 25% of the full rate, and the province continued to levy its own succession duty;
 In Ontario and Quebec, the federal government collected estate taxes at only 50% of the full rate, and remitted 50% of such collections to such provinces, and the provinces continued to levy their own succession duties.

When Edgar Benson's white paper on tax reform was issued in 1969, his original intention was to retain estate and gift taxes in conjunction with introducing capital gains tax, with appropriate relief to avoid double taxation. After public consultations were held through hearings by parliamentary committees, he announced that, as "it is no longer possible to establish a uniform national system of death duties through federal legislation," the federal government would vacate the estate and gift tax field on December 31, 1971. At that time, only British Columbia, Ontario and Quebec were still levying duties of their own. Most of the other provinces revived their succession duties, and also started levying gift taxes, on January 1, 1972.

Provincial succession duties (after 1971)
Succession duties continued until the following dates:

These taxes were seen to have died out because of their relative unattractiveness, as noted by Peter Hogg:

effective legislation is difficult to draft
its complexity makes the taxes costly to administer, relative to the amounts raised
the taxes lead to an avoidance industry, often including shifting assets out of the province

Provincial gift tax (after 1971)
Gift taxes were levied until the following dates:

Conversion to deemed dispositions for capital gains tax (after 1971)
Upon the repeal of the federal estate and gift taxes on January 1, 1972, the income tax régime was altered to provide for a capital gains tax, which included liability arising from the "deemed disposition" of assets. Liability will arise from gifts from, and the death of, the taxpayer, as well in the following circumstances:

 the use of a property has changed
 the taxpayer emigrates from Canada
 a trust for a taxpayer's spouse or common-law partner, when that beneficiary dies, or on the 21st anniversary of a trust

Recent conversion of provincial probate fees into probate taxes
The provinces have moved in recent years to convert fees for the granting of letters probate and letters of administration from flat rates to ones based on the value of the estate. In 1992, Ontario introduced fees at a level higher than in any other province. The Supreme Court of Canada declared that the method by which it was introduced was unconstitutional, as its basis had not been the subject of appropriate legislation.

As a result, the provinces passed legislation to legitimate the fees already in effect:

Expansion of scope in Ontario (2015)
Ontario already had the highest rates relating to probate taxes, but is still faced with large budget deficits. The provincial 2011 budget speech stated that there was still a compliance problem with respect to the Estate Administration Tax, and it accordingly passed amending legislation that year, coming into effect on January 1, 2015, which provided for the following changes:

 in addition to the requirement to pay a deposit on tax that was already in place in order to receive an estate certificate, an estate representative must file an estate information return within 90 days of the date the certificate was issued, together with any balance of tax still owing
 where a later statement under the Estates Act discloses any property that was not previously disclosed on the estate information return, the estate representative must file an amended return within 30 days of the statement date
 the Minister of Finance has similar powers to examine the information as he has under the Retail Sales Tax Act
 there is no procedure for the estate to receive a clearance certificate with respect to closing off any further liability

The changes have been viewed as "put[ting] undue pressure on executorsoften family membersfaced with balancing their grief with trying to make the Finance Ministry happy."

Further reading

Notes

References

 
Personal taxes
Canada
Transfer tax
History of taxation
Taxation and redistribution
Financial history of Canada